A hostile environment may refer to:-

 Home Office hostile environment policy in the United Kingdom
 A hostile work environment under United States labour law
 Hostile Environment, an album by Rasco
 Hostile Environment: How Immigrants Became Scapegoats, a 2019 book
 Hostile Environment and Emergency First Aid Training